Ben Daglish (31 July 1966 – 1 October 2018) was an English composer and musician. Born in London,  his parents moved to Sheffield when he was one year old. He was known for creating many soundtracks for home computer games during the 1980s, including such as The Last Ninja, Trap, Krakout, and Deflektor. Daglish teamed up with fellow C64 musician and prolific programmer Tony Crowther, forming W.E.M.U.S.I.C., which stood for "We Make Use of Sound in Computers". Daglish had attended the same school as Crowther. Daglish mostly worked freelance but was employed by Gremlin Graphics for a couple of years.

Biography 
Daglish lived in Derbyshire where he composed, played and performed in a number of UK bands, including Loscoe State Opera. He also regularly performed with violinist Mark Knight and the band SID80s at retro computer game events such as Back in Time Live and Retrovision. He had also performed with Commodore 64 revival band Press Play On Tape together with Rob Hubbard. He was a fan of the late Ronnie Hazlehurst, a prolific composer for television. He died from complications from lung cancer on 1 October 2018.

Compositions

Amstrad CPC
 Basil the Great Mouse Detective
 Dark Fusion (1988 – Gremlin Graphics Software)
 Deflektor (1987 – Vortex Software)
 H.A.T.E. – Hostile All Terrain Encounter (1989 – Vortex Software)
 Mask (1987 – Gremlin Graphics Software)
 Mask II (1988 – Gremlin Graphics Software)
 Masters of the Universe (Les Maitres De L'Univers) (1987 – Gremlin Graphics Software)
 North Star (1988 – Gremlin Graphics Software)
 Skate Crazy (1988 – Gremlin Graphics Software)
 Supercars (1990 – Gremlin Graphics Software)
 Switch Blade (1990 – Gremlin Graphics Software)
 Terramex Cosmic Relief : Prof. Renegade to the Rescue (1988 – Grandslam)
 The Real Stunt Experts (1989 – Alternative Software)
 Thing Bounces Back (1987 – Gremlin Graphics Software)

Atari ST
 3D Galax (1987)
 Action Fighter (1986)
 Artura (1988)
 Axel's Magic Hammer (1989)
 Blasteroids (1989)
 Butcher Hill (1989)
 California Games (1989)
 Captain America - Defies the Doom Tube (1988)
 Chase H.Q. (1989)
 Chubby Gristle (1988)
 Continental Circus (1989)
 Cosmic Relief (1987)
 Dark Fusion (1988)
 Deflektor (1988)
 Dynamite Düx (1988)
 FoFT - Federation of Free Traders (1989)
 Footballer of the Year 2 (1989)
 Gary Lineker's Hot Shots
 Greg Norman's Ultimate Golf (1990)
 H.A.T.E. – Hostile All Terrain Encounter (1989)
 Hot Rod (1990)
 John Lowe's Ultimate Darts (1989)
 Kingmaker (1993)
 Legends of Valour (1993)
 Lotus Esprit Turbo Challenge (1990)
 Masters of the Universe (1988)
 Mickey Mouse: The Computer Game (1988)
 Monty Python's Flying Circus (1990)
 Motor Massacre (1988)
 Motörhead (1992)
 North Star (1988) 
 Pac-Mania (1989)
 Passing Shot (1988)
 Prison (1989)
 Rick Dangerous (1989)
 Rick Dangerous 2 (1990)
 Road Raider (1988)
 Saint & Greavsie (1989)
 Skidz (1990)
 Super Cars (1989)
 Super Scramble Simulator (1989)
 Switchblade (1989)
 Terramex (1987)
 The Flintstones (1988)
 The Munsters (1988)
 The Running Man (1989)
 Thunderbirds (1989)
 Wizard Warz (1987)
 Xybots (1989)

Commodore 64
 720°
 Ark Pandora
 Alternative World Games
 Artura
 Auf Wiedersehen Monty (with Rob Hubbard)
 Avenger
 Basil the Great Mouse Detective
 Biggles
 Blasteroids
 Blood Brothers
 Blood Valley
 Bobby Bearing
 Bulldog
 Bombo
 Challenge of the Gobots
 Chubby Gristle
 Cobra (arrangement of the unused movie theme "Skyline" by Sylvester Levay)
 Dark Fusion
 Death Wish 3 (1987)
 Defenders of the Earth
 Deflektor
 Dogfight 2187
 Firelord (1986)
 Footballer of the Year
 Footballer of the Year 2
 Future Knight
 Future Knight II
 Gary Lineker's Hot Shot
 Gary Lineker's Super Skills
 Gauntlet and Gauntlet II
 Greg Norman's Ultimate Golf
 Hades Nebula
 Harvey Headbanger
 He-Man and the Masters of the Universe
 Heroes of the Lance
 Jack the Nipper
 Jack the Nipper II
 Kettle
 Killer-Ring
 Krakout
 L.O.C.O.
 Mask III – Venom Strikes Back
 Mickey Mouse
 Mountie Mick's Death Ride
 Munsters
 Northstar
 Olli and Lissa
 Pac-Mania
 Percy the Potty Pigeon
 Potty Pidgeon (Death tune only)
 Pub Games
 Re-Bounder
 Real Stunt Experts
 Return of the Mutant Camels
 Skate Crazy
 SkateRock
 Super Cars
 Supersports
 Switchblade
 TechnoCop
 They Stole a Million
 Thing Bounces Back
 Terramex
 The Flintstones
 The Last Ninja (with Anthony Lees)
 Trap
 Vikings
 Way of the Tiger
 William Wobbler
 Wizard Warz
 Zarjaz
Source: The High Voltage SID Collection

Amiga
 Artura (1989)
 Chubby Gristle (1988)
 Deflektor (1988)
 Federation of Free Traders (1989)
 Pac-Mania (1988, re-arrangement of arcade game tunes)
 Switchblade (1989)
 Corporation (1990)
Super Cars (1990)

ZX Spectrum
 Artura (1989)
 Auf Wiedersehen Monty (1987)
 Avenger (1986)
 Blasteroids (1987)
 Blood Brothers (1988)
 Blood Valley (1987)
 Butcher Hill (1989)
 Challenge of the Gobots (1987)
 Chubby Gristle (1988)
 Dark Fusion (1988)
 Death Wish 3 (1987)
 Deflektor (1988)
 The Flintstones (1988)
 Footballer of the Year (1987)
 Future Knight (1987)
 Gary Lineker's Hot Shots (1988)
 Gary Lineker's Super Skills (1988)
 Gauntlet 2 (1988)
 H.A.T.E. – Hostile All Terrain Encounter (1989)
 Jack the Nipper 2: in Coconut Capers (1987)
 Krakout (1987)
 Mask 1, Mask 2 (1988)
 MASK III: Venom Strikes Back (1988)
 Masters of the Universe (1987)
 Mickey Mouse (1988)
 Moley Christmas (1987)
 Motor Massacre (1989)
 Mountie Mick's Death Ride
 North Star (1988)
 Pacmania (1988)
 The Real Stunt Experts
 Skate Crazy (1988)
 Super Scramble Simulator (1989)
 Super Sports
 Switchblade (1991)
 Techno Cop (1988)
 Terramex (1988)
 Thing Bounces Back (1987)
 Trap (128k) (1985)
 Wizard Wars

References

External links
Homepage

Artist profile at OverClocked ReMix
C64Audio.com Publisher and record label for Daglish's Commodore 64 music
Remix64's Interview with Ben Daglish
English podcast interview from retrokompott.de
Profile at MobyGames

1966 births
2018 deaths
Musicians from London
Commodore 64 music
English electronic musicians
Video game composers
Deaths from lung cancer